The 2014–15 UMBC Retrievers men's basketball team  represented the University of Maryland, Baltimore County during the 2014–15 NCAA Division I men's basketball season. The Retrievers, led by third-year head coach Aki Thomas, played their home games at the Retriever Activities Center and were members of the America East Conference. They finished the season 4–26, 2–14 in America East play to finish in a tie for eighth place. They lost in the quarterfinals of the America East tournament to Vermont.

Roster

Schedule

|-
!colspan=9 style="background:#000000; color:#ffb210;"| Regular season

|-
!colspan=9 style="background:#000000; color:#ffb210;"| America East tournament

References

UMBC
UMBC Retrievers men's basketball seasons
UMBC
UMBC